The 2009 Mississippi Valley State Delta Devils football team represented Mississippi Valley State University during the 2009 NCAA Division I FCS football season. Head coach Willie Totten resigned after the end of the season, the Delta Devils' third straight 3-win season.

Schedule

References

Mississippi Valley State
Mississippi Valley State Delta Devils football seasons
Mississippi Valley State Delta Devils football